Gloire was a 52-gun frigate of the French Navy. She took part in the Battle of Veracruz i Mexico soon after her commissioning.

Gloire was decommissioned in Brest in 1843, but reactivated in 1847 under Captain Lapierre for operations in the Sea of China. She took part in the Bombardment of Tourane on 15 April 1847.

On 18 August 1847, she ran aground on an island off the western coast of Korea, along with the frigate Victorieuse.

Footnotes 
Notes

Citations

References

See also
List of French sail frigates

Age of Sail frigates of France
1837 ships
Maritime incidents in August 1847
Shipwrecks of Korea